Kenhardt (founded 1868) is a small town in the Northern Cape province of South Africa. This little town is about 120 km from Upington, the largest town in the area.

History
On 27 December 1868, special magistrate Maximillian Jackson with a police contingent, was sent to act against the Griquas in the area. The Griqua's anti-colonial resistance had erupted into an open conflict. Jackson arrived in Kenhardt and set up camp under a giant camelthorn tree.

This has been for a long time the most remote settlement in the North-Western Cape. With time the town developed from under this tree, becoming a municipality in 1909. The Hartbees River, with its many sweet thorn trees, provides a green belt irrigated by the Rooiberg Dam. Kenhardt is famous for being at the heart of the Dorper sheep-farming area.

Geography
This region contains very little vegetation, primarily very low shrubs and yellow grass among a rocky desert kind of landscape. If you travel south from Kenhardt towards Brandvlei, you will pass through a huge landscape of yellow grass lands and rocky desert like ares for the next 145 km and more. During the seasons many birds flock to the pans, when they contain water, after some rainfall. Temperature above 40 °C is not uncommon.

Activities
 Visit the Quiver Tree forest, Kokerboom Woud in Afrikaans, about 5 km south of Kenhardt on the main route to Cape Town. Some of these trees have special formed weaver birds nests. The forest comprises approximately 4,000 to 5,000 trees.
 Walk the geological legendary granite metamorphic outcrops of the area. Along the trail all kind of quartz lie scattered.
 Tours to the pans on the outlying farms where you can view San artwork and enjoy the farm hospitality.
 A hiking trail where Anglo Boer War remains and the beautiful landscape can be experienced.
 Make your own discoveries on fossilized foot impressions and engravings.

Places of interest

Giant Camelthorn Tree
This tree is about 500–600 years old. It is under this tree which Magistrate Jackson set up his camp in 1868.

Old Library Building
The old library was built in 1897, and it was used until 1977. In 1978 it was declared a national monument, currently it is used by Sanlam as their office.

Verneukpan
A vast dry pan on which Sir Malcolm Campbell tried, in Bluebird 1, to set a new world land-speed record in 1929.

See also
 List of cities and towns in the Northern Cape
 Northern Cape
 Kakamas, Northern Cape
 Upington, Northern Cape

References

External links

 Northern Cape - As real as the people who choose to explore it!
 UPINGTON.COM - Kenhardt Accommodation | Kenhardt Hotels...
 History of Kenhardt

Populated places in the Kai !Garib Local Municipality
Populated places established in 1868
Karoo
Bushmanland, Northern Cape